Wah Gwin Gwin Falls, also known as Lullaby Falls, is a waterfall of Phelps Creek located in the property of the historic Columbia Gorge Hotel, in Hood River County, in the U.S. state of Oregon. The waterfall is notable for its main drop of  that plunges through steep cascades into the Columbia River, south of the city of Hood River, Oregon.

The waterfall runs next to a terrace built along the edge of the back side of the hotel. The terrace is flanked by a wall built with the same masonry ashlar technique of the entry way of the hotel.

History 
The name of the waterfall and the hotel with the same name that once sat on the lot prior to the Columbia Gorge Hotel may have stemmed from a Native American word that means "rushing waters".

See also 
 List of waterfalls in Oregon

References

Waterfalls of Oregon
Waterfalls of Hood River County, Oregon